The São João River is a river of Rio de Janeiro state in southeastern Brazil. It runs into the Atlantic at Rio das Ostras.

Its basin includes part of the União Biological Reserve, home to a population of endangered golden lion tamarin.

See also
List of rivers of Rio de Janeiro

References

Brazilian Ministry of Transport

Rivers of Rio de Janeiro (state)